Paul Wade Bowen (born 1977) is an American Texas Country/Red Dirt singer from Waco, Texas, United States.

Bowen was a member of the band West 84 with friend Matt Miller until 2001 when the group became known as Wade Bowen and West 84. He released his first album in 2002, Try Not To Listen, which became a regional hit in Texas. He released his first live album in 2003, recorded live at The Blue Light in Lubbock, Texas, followed by studio albums Lost Hotel in 2006 and If We Ever Make It Home in 2008. On November 21, 2009, Bowen recorded his second live album at Billy Bob's Texas in Fort Worth. The album was released on April 27, 2010, as a CD/DVD combo.

Bowen released his fourth studio album, The Given, in 2010.  It was his first on a major label, Sony imprint BNA Records, though he returned to releasing music independently after BNA closed.  He released a self-titled studio album in 2014, followed by a duets album in 2015 with singer Randy Rogers of the Randy Rogers Band, titled Hold My Beer Vol. 1.  Bowen's next album was  Then Sings My Soul: Songs for My Mother, a solo gospel influenced studio release. He has released 3 more albums: Watch This, with Randy Rogers, Solid Ground, released in 2018, and a follow up to Hold My Beer Vol. 1, Hold My Beer Vol. 2 with Randy Rogers.

During the Covid-19 Pandemic of 2020, Wade started a web series of live shows called Wade's World, where he hosted other prominent Texas musicians to play and tell stories about their songs every Friday night. Guests included Bruce Robison, Cody Canada, Jack Ingram, and others.

Personal life
Bowen is the brother-in-law of Cross Canadian Ragweed frontman Cody Canada and is a graduate of Texas Tech University, where he was a member of the Epsilon Nu chapter of the Sigma Chi fraternity.

Discography

Albums

Singles

Music videos

References

American country singer-songwriters
American male singer-songwriters
Singer-songwriters from Texas
Living people
BNA Records artists
Columbia Records artists
Texas Tech University alumni
Country musicians from Texas
1977 births